Matthew Jones (born 19 April 1980) is an Australian professional golfer who plays on LIV Golf. Previously he played on the PGA Tour where he won twice, in the 2014 Shell Houston Open and The Honda Classic in 2021. Jones has also won the Emirates Australian Open twice, in 2015 and 2019.

Amateur career
Jones was born in Sydney. He later moved to the United States to attend Arizona State University where he was a first-team All-American. He turned professional in 2001.

Professional career
Jones joined the Nationwide Tour in 2004, but did not have a break-out year until 2007. After having only a combined 8 top-10 finishes in his first three seasons between 2004 and 2006, he almost matched that in one season. He had 6 top-10s in 2007, finishing second four times and losing in two playoffs. He finished 7th on the money list and qualified to play his rookie season on the PGA Tour in 2008.

In his rookie season on the PGA Tour in 2008, Jones found limited success. His best finish of the season was a tie for 4th at the Honda Classic and the Buick Open. He finished the season with $775,899, but did not finish inside the top 125 on the money list, leaving him with conditional status for the 2009 season. In 2009 Jones had two top-10s, both 5th-place finishes at the Buick Invitational and at the John Deere Classic. At the six-round PGA Tour Qualifying Tournament in December 2009, where the top 25 finishers obtained their 2010 PGA Tour cards, Jones finished 3rd.

He finished fifth at the 2010 John Deere Classic and seventh at the Quail Hollow Championship. Also, he finished second at the Australian Open. His best result in 2011 was sixth at the Zurich Classic of New Orleans.

Jones improved in the 2013 PGA Tour season. He resulted second at the Greenbrier Classic, fifth at the Wyndham Championship, sixth at the Memorial Tournament, seventh at the John Deere Classic and eighth at the BMW Championship. Later he finished sixth at the Australian Open.

In his 156th PGA Tour start, Jones got his first PGA Tour win at the 2014 Shell Houston Open, beating Matt Kuchar on the first playoff hole when he made a 42-yard chip in for a birdie. He had previously made a 46-foot putt on the 18th hole to take the match to a playoff. The win also made Jones the last guaranteed entrant to the Masters and moved him to 41st in the Official World Golf Ranking. In May he finished 17th at The Players Championship.

In the 2015 PGA season, Jones finished 11th at the Hyundai Tournament of Champions. At the 2015 PGA Championship, Jones led the tournament by two strokes over Jason Day at the 36-hole stage. He shot rounds of 68–65 over the first two days for a total of 11-under-par. He started the third round strongly and extended his lead to three strokes midway through the round, but ended the round poorly, dropping four strokes in his last four holes to finish five behind the 54-hole leader, Jason Day. He would end the tournament T-21.

On 29 November 2015, Jones won his first title on his home PGA Tour of Australasia, with a victory in the Emirates Australian Open, one of the three Australian majors. He held off challenges by the world number one Jordan Spieth and Adam Scott to prevail by one stroke. Jones had led by three going into the final round, but dropped three shots in his opening two holes and also carded a triple bogey on the ninth hole. But he recovered by shooting two under on the back nine for a 73 to claim victory by one stroke. The win qualified Jones for the 2016 Open Championship.

On 8 December 2019, Jones won the Emirates Australian Open for the second time. With this win, he became one of 14 players, including Gary Player, Jack Nicklaus, Greg Norman, Peter Thomson and Jordan Spieth, who have won the Australian Open at least twice since World War II.

In March 2021, Jones won The Honda Classic by five strokes, for his first PGA Tour victory since 2014.

In June 2022, Jones signed with LIV Golf.

Personal life
Jones is married to Melissa Weber, who represented Idaho in Miss USA 2009 and has three daughters. His brother Brett was formerly the head club professional of Due Process Stable Golf Club in Colts Neck, New Jersey but has since moved to Sydney Australia. Brett played in the 2015 PGA Championship.

Professional wins (4)

PGA Tour wins (2)

PGA Tour playoff record (1–0)

PGA Tour of Australasia wins (2)

1Co-sanctioned by the OneAsia Tour

Playoff record
Nationwide Tour playoff record (0–2)

Results in major championships
Results not in chronological order in 2020.

CUT = missed the half-way cut
WD = withdrew
"T" = tied
NT = No tournament due to COVID-19 pandemic

Summary

Most consecutive cuts made – 6 (2014 Open – 2016 PGA)
Longest streak of top-10s – 0

Results in The Players Championship

CUT = missed the halfway cut
"T" indicates a tie for a place
C = Cancelled after the first round due to the COVID-19 pandemic

Results in World Golf Championships
Results not in chronological order before 2015.

1Cancelled due to COVID-19 pandemic

QF, R16, R32, R64 = Round in which player lost in match play
NT = No tournament
"T" = Tied

See also
2007 Nationwide Tour graduates
2009 PGA Tour Qualifying School graduates
2012 PGA Tour Qualifying School graduates
2017 Web.com Tour Finals graduates
2018 Web.com Tour Finals graduates

References

External links

Profile, Australasia PGA Tour; accessed 10 April 2014. 

Matt Jones profile, Golf Australia website; accessed 10 April 2014.

Australian male golfers
Arizona State Sun Devils men's golfers
PGA Tour of Australasia golfers
PGA Tour golfers
LIV Golf players
Korn Ferry Tour graduates
Golfers from Sydney
1980 births
Living people